Lord Humongous is a professional wrestling character also known as a "gimmick" that was originally introduced in Memphis' Continental Wrestling Association (CWA) in 1984. The character was based on a gang leader called "the Humungus" or at times "Lord Humungus" from the 1981 movie Mad Max 2: The Road Warrior. The original Lord Humongous was portrayed by Mike Stark, who was tall and physically impressive like the character in the movie. Since Lord Humongous always wears a Hockey mask it allowed promoters to replace the man under the mask without having to publicly acknowledge that it was someone else playing the part. The character became a recurring gimmick on the CWA but was also used in other promotions after the CWA closed. The character has been played by a number of wrestlers including Jeff Van Camp Sr., Sid Vicious and Barry Buchanan and Sid's son Gunnar Eudy. Scott Hall wrestled as Lord Humongous in PWF out of Florida in 1989. John King wrestled as Lord Humongous in 1985 Texas All Star Wrestling along with Mad Maxx John Richmond aka Eli the Eliminator managed by Slick.

Character history
The character was introduced as Manager Jimmy Hart's latest "Monster heel" (wrestling term for someone who portrays the "bad guys" in the ring) to challenge Continental Wrestling Association (CWA) dominant face (someone who plays the "good guy" in the ring) Jerry "the King" Lawler. The original Lord Humongous was portrayed by Mike Stark, chosen for his impressive physique. Based on the character "the Humungus" from Mad Max 2: The Road Warrior movie Lord Humongous would always wear a Hockey mask that would cover his entire face as well as ring gear that resembled the post-apocalyptic world of Mad Max 2. Stark only played Lord Humongous for the first couple of months of 1984 before he was replaced by Jeff Van Camp under the mask without the CWA revealing that it was a different man playing the part. Lord Humongous (Jeff Van Camp Sr.) was introduced to the public with an official music video “War Machine” by KISS and became a theme song when entering the ring.  Later on CWA would reuse the Lord Humongous ring character some young wrestlers who had a very muscular physique. One such wrestler was Sid Eudy who played Lord Humongous in 1987. He would later move on to work for both World Championship Wrestling (WCW) and the World Wrestling Federation (WWF) under various names including "Sid Vicious" "Sid Justice" and "Sycho Sid." Sid would go on to win the WWF Championship and WCW World Heavyweight championship belts. In the 1990s rookie Barry Buchanan would play the part of Lord Humongous before moving on to working for the WWF as Bull Buchanan. In 2009 Sid's son Gunnar Eudy, a rookie with an impressive physique, played the same part his father did 22 years earlier as he competed as Lord Humongous. John Gavin has played the role of Lord Humongous off and on since 1984 while John Bass also played the part from 1999 to 2010.

List of wrestlers who portrayed Lord Humongous

References

External links
University of Memphis Webpage of Mike Stark (the original Lord Humongous)

Professional wrestling gimmicks
Masked wrestlers